Magdalene Merritt (LaGrange; September 17, 1864 – 1935) was an American poet. She published two volumes, Songs of the Helderberg (1893) and Helderberg harmonies (1909).

Early life and education
Magdalene Isadora La Grange was born in Guilderland, New York, September 17, 1864. Her parents were Myndert (1815-1892) and Julia Ann (1821-1902), second cousins of Count Johannes de la Grange who emigrated to the United States in 1656 from La Rochelle, France. Magdalene's siblings included, James, Andrew, Eleanor, Myndert, Vanderzee, Julia, Norman, Hester, Angelica, Ada, Harlan, Clinton, and Mary. Her family was of Huguenot origin. The ancestral home, "Elmwood Farm", was in the possession of the family for more than 200 years. 

Merritt was educated in the Albany Female College, Albany, New York. She studied for three years with Prof. William P. Morgan.

Career
She began at an early age to write prose articles for the press. Some of her early poems were published and were so well-received that she continued writing others. Her songs were of the plaintive kind, religious and subjective in tone. Merritt's poems appeared in the Springfield Republican, The American Agriculturist, Christian Work,  Evangelist, and the Locomotive Engineers Journal. Her commemorative poem, "The Tried and True", was read aloud in Guilderland at services commemorating the town's history in 1890, 2003, and 2012.

A poetry collection, Songs of the Helderberg, was issued in 1893, under her maiden name, and included her portrait on the frontispiece. A review of the collection by the Locomotive Engineers Journal (1893) mentioned,— "She generally choses simple themes, making them attractive with truth and deep feeling. One of the leading charms of her verse is its directness and simplicity of diction. the book is not only charming in itself, but interesting for its rich promise for the future."

She married Aaron Merritt of Voorheesville, locomotive engineer on the West Shore Railroad; they had no children. They lived on her farm, "Oak Knoll, located on the banks of the Normans Kill. Helderberg harmonies, published in 1909 under her married name, Magdalene Merritt, includes views of Helderberg by the landscape photographer, Clayton Le Gallez, of Albany.

Selected works

Magdalene I. La Grange
 Songs of the Helderberg, 1893 (Text)

Magdalene Merritt
 Helderberg harmonies, 1909 (Text)

References

Attribution

External links
 
 

1864 births
1935 deaths
19th-century American poets
20th-century American poets
19th-century American women writers
20th-century American women writers
American women poets
People from Guilderland, New York
Writers from New York (state)
Wikipedia articles incorporating text from A Woman of the Century